William Dick may refer to:
Billy Dick (1889–1960), Australian rules footballer
William Dick of Braid (1580–1655), Scottish financier
William Dick (Australian politician) (1865–1932)
William Dick (cricketer) (1922–2004), Australian cricketer
William Dick (footballer) (born 1901), Scottish footballer (Airdrieonians, Hibernian, Bradford Park Avenue)
William Dick (Manitoba politician) (1821–1904), politician in Manitoba, Canada
William Dick (Wisconsin politician), member of the Wisconsin State Assembly
William Dick (British Columbia politician), member of the Legislative Assembly of British Columbia
William Reid Dick (1879–1961), Scottish sculptor
William Wentworth FitzWilliam Dick (1805–1892), member of the UK Parliament for Wicklow
Willie Dick (footballer) (born 1966), Australian rules footballer
William Dick (veterinary surgeon) (1793–1866), founder of the Royal (Dick) School of Veterinary Studies in Edinburgh, Scotland

See also
William Dick-Cunyngham (1851–1900), Scottish recipient of the Victoria Cross
William Dix (disambiguation)